In telecommunication, a recovery procedure is a process that attempts to bring a system back to a normal operating state. Examples:
The actions necessary to restore an automated information system's data files and computational capability after a system failure. 
In data communications, a process whereby a data station attempts to resolve conflicting or erroneous conditions arising during the data transfer.

See also
Error detection and correction
Fault-tolerant design
Fault-tolerant system

References

Telecommunications techniques
Fault tolerance